The Somaliland National Party, sometimes referred to as the Waddani National Party and better known by its shortened Somali form Waddani, is a political party in Somaliland. The party was founded by Abdirahman Mohamed Abdullahi (Irro) in 2012, ahead of the second municipal elections later that year. On 16 November 2021 Hersi Ali Haji Hassan was elected as the new chairman of the opposition party.

Economically the party leans left, defending the establishment of a universal healthcare system, public investment and doubling resources in education. It is progressive on issues regarding minority rights and fundamental freedoms, such as proposing a quorum of 30% of women in parliament. The party also supports greater decentralisation. Additionally, the party places great importance on Islamic moral and cultural heritage, and intends to give it a more important place in the education system and in the establishment of laws. The party's economic and diplomatic policy is also more nationalist than that of its rivals, and this nationalism also applies to issues of defense, with the party promising to increase funding dedicated to the army.

The constitution of Somaliland only allows for the top three political parties to contest elections, to avoid the previous proliferation of clan-based parties in the 1960s. Waddani became one of the three in 2012, replacing the United Peoples' Democratic Party (UDUB).

2017 Somaliland presidential election

Presidential elections were held on 13 November 2017, the third direct presidential election since 2003. General elections had been scheduled to be held on 27 March 2017 to elect both the President and House of Representatives, but were postponed by six months due to the drought condition in the region. The elections to elect the President and Vice President were eventually held separately on 13 November. Incumbent President Ahmed Mohamed Mohamoud of the Peace, Unity, and Development Party (Kulmiye) did not run for a second term.

The result was a victory for ruling Kulmiye party candidate Muse Bihi Abdi, who received 55% of the vote.

2021 Somaliland parliamentary election

Parliamentary elections were held in Somaliland on 31 May 2021, the first since 2005. On 6 June it was announced that Waddani had received 31 out of 82 seats and it will form a coalition with the Justice and Welfare Party (UCID). The coalition will have 52 seats combined, compared to previous ruling party Kulmiye which has only 30.

Electoral history

Presidential elections

Parliamentary elections

Local elections

See also
 List of political parties in Somaliland

Notes

External links
 Waddani website

Islamic political parties in Somaliland
Political parties in Somaliland